Foz Cataratas Futsal, is a Brazilian futsal club based in Foz do Iguaçu. It has won the 2018 edition of Chave Ouro.

Club honours

State competitions
 Chave Ouro: 2018

Current squad

References

External links
 Foz Cataratas official website
 Foz Cataratas LNF profile
 Foz Cataratas in zerozero.pt

Futsal clubs established in 2010
2010 establishments in Brazil
Futsal clubs in Brazil
Sports teams in Paraná